Thromboxane B2 is an inactive metabolite/product of thromboxane A2.  It is almost completely cleared in the urine.

It itself is not involved in platelet activation and aggregation in case of a wound, but its precursor, thromboxane A2, is. Thromboxane A2 synthesis is the target of the drug aspirin, which inhibits the COX-1 enzyme (the source of thromboxane A2 in platelets). 

2-(3,4-Di-hydroxyphenyl)-ethanol (DHPE) is a phenolic component of extra-virgin olive oil. An olive oil fraction containing DHPE can inhibit platelet aggregation and thromboxane B2 formation in vitro.

References 

Eicosanoids